Alberto Maria Fontana (born 2 December 1974) is an Italian retired footballer who played as a goalkeeper.

He spent the vast majority of his 18-year senior career as a backup. In Serie A, he represented Torino and Novara, for a total of 25 games.

Football career
Born in Turin, Fontana started his career at Juventus but played his first seasons as a senior in Serie C1, Serie C2 and Serie D. In mid-1998 he joined Serie B club Hellas Verona F.C. and, the following campaign, he returned to the third division, successively representing A.C. Reggiana 1919 and A.C. Sandonà 1922.

In mid-2000 Fontana returned to the second level, signing with A.C. Pistoiese where he served as David Dei's backup. He met the same fate at his new club U.S. Città di Palermo (A.S. Roma's farm team at that time), to Vincenzo Sicignano.

In June 2002 Fontana joined Torino F.C. of the top division in a co-ownership deal, in exchange with Gabriele Paoletti. During his seven-year stint, the longest of his career, he played second-fiddle to Luca Bucci, Stefano Sorrentino, Massimo Taibi, Christian Abbiati and Matteo Sereni.

In summer 2009, 35-year-old Fontana was released by Toro and joined Novara Calcio in division three, where he again was second-choice, now to Albania's Samir Ujkani. He also played a few games due to injury of the latter, including 15 in 2011–12's top level, which ended in relegation.

Italian football scandal
On 18 June 2012, Fontana was banned along with former Novara teammate Nicola Ventola for three years and six months, as the Italian Football Federation found the match between Novara and A.C. Chievo Verona for the 2010–11 Coppa Italia to be fixed. Cristian Bertani was also arrested.

In November 2012, Fontana's appeal to the Italian Olympic Committee's TNAS was accepted. His contract was terminated late in that year, and he retired shortly after.

Personal life
Fontana is not related to another football goalkeeper, also named Alberto Fontana, who had an even longer professional career. As his footballing namesake, he was nicknamed Jimmy after singer Jimmy Fontana.

Honours

Individual
Torino F.C. Hall of Fame: 2015

References

External links
 
 Football.it profile 
 Gazzetta dello Sport profile (2007–08) 
 

1974 births
Living people
Footballers from Turin
Italian footballers
Association football goalkeepers
Serie A players
Serie B players
Serie C players
Juventus F.C. players
A.S.D. AVC Vogherese 1919 players
Hellas Verona F.C. players
A.C. Reggiana 1919 players
U.S. Pistoiese 1921 players
A.S. Roma players
Palermo F.C. players
Torino F.C. players
Novara F.C. players